Heather Chase is an American politician. She is the representative of the Windsor-Windham District of the Vermont House of Representatives. A Democrat, Chase won against Republican opponent Eva Ryan.

Chase is a small business owner, nurse and member of the Chester Select Board. She is the President and founder of Corporate Lactation Service, Inc. Chase has a Bachelor’s degree in nursing from Seattle University and from San Jose State University, a Master’s in Community Health.

References 

Women state legislators in Vermont
Democratic Party members of the Vermont House of Representatives
Seattle University alumni
San Jose State University alumni
American nurses
Year of birth missing (living people)
Living people